In a poem by the Greek poet Pindar (5th-century BC), Angelia (Ancient Greek: Ἀγγελία ('Message') is mentioned as a daughter of the Greek messenger-god Hermes, where she is understood as "message" personified.

Notes

References 
 Liddell, Henry George, Robert Scott. A Greek-English Lexicon, revised and augmented throughout by Sir Henry Stuart Jones with the assistance of Roderick McKenzie, Clarendon Press Oxford, 1940. Online version at the Perseus Digital Library.
 Pindar, Odes, Diane Arnson Svarlien. 1990. Online version at the Perseus Digital Library.
 Pindar, Olympian Odes. Pythian Odes. Edited and translated by William H. Race. Loeb Classical Library No. 56. Cambridge, Massachusetts: Harvard University Press, 1997. . Online version at Harvard University Press.

Greek goddesses
Messenger goddesses
Personifications in Greek mythology
Children of Hermes